Onopryivka Ukraine, is the site of an ancient mega-settlement dating to 4300 4000 BC belonging to the Cucuteni-Trypillian culture. This proto-city is just one of 2440 Cucuteni–Trypillia settlements discovered so far in Moldova and Ukraine. Some 194 (8%) of these settlements had an area of more than 10 hectares between 5000 and 2700 BC and more than 29 settlements had an area in the range 100–450 hectares.

See also
 Cucuteni-Trypillian culture
 Danube Valley cultures

References

Cucuteni–Trypillia culture